Beer Wars is a 2009 documentary film about the American beer industry. In particular, it covers the differences between large corporate breweries, namely Anheuser-Busch, the Miller Brewing Company, and the Coors Brewing Company opposed to smaller breweries like Dogfish Head Brewery, Moonshot 69, Yuengling, Stone Brewing Co., and other producers of craft beer. Also covered is how advertising and lobbyists are used to control the beer market, implying that these things harm competition and consumer choice.

Throughout the film, there is a theme that the smallest breweries have next to no chance to compete due to the sheer volume of advertising and outdated beer distribution laws. The original laws demanded a three-tier system to separate the powers of selling beer. The law demands that the beer brewer cannot deliver directly to the retailer, supposedly creating a separation of powers resembling the US government's legislative, judicial, and executive branches. The film claims these laws are now inhibiting growth of smaller brewers and therefore allowing the largest brewers (Coors, Anheuser-Busch, and Miller) to maintain an oligopoly on beer.

The film was written, produced, narrated, and directed by Anat Baron, former head of Mike's Hard Lemonade.

See also
 American Beer (documentary)

References

External links
 
 

2009 films
American business films
American documentary films
Beer journalism
Documentary films about business
2009 documentary films
Documentary films about beer
2000s business films
2000s English-language films
2000s American films
Films about companies